The International Museum of Art & Science (IMAS) is a museum located in McAllen, Texas. It is dedicated to exhibiting Latin American art, as well as educating visitors about science. Its exhibits include antique stained glass, images from the Hubble Space Telescope, and the Discovery Pavilion, an educational children's exhibit.  The museum also features a sculpture garden and a science playground.

The museum's art collections include European art from the 16th to 19th centuries, Japanese prints, Modern art and folk art.

The International Museum of Art & Science is a Smithsonian Affiliate and fully accredited by the American Alliance of Museums. 

The museum provides a unique opportunity for visitors to participate in hands-on science exhibits and learn about original works of art while encouraging creativity and innovation.

Mission 
The International Museum of Art & Science (IMAS) located in the Rio Grande Valley inspires audiences of all ages to explore art and science through its permanent collections, exhibits, programs, and partnerships by empowering learners to discover their interests and pursue their passions.

Vision 
The International Museum of Art & Science will be a destination for accessible, innovative, awe-inspiring learning through diverse art and science experiences that prepare our community for the future.

History 
The Museum was developed through the efforts of the McAllen Junior League to increase the quality of life for the citizens of the Rio Grande Valley, and to provide activities in the arts and sciences that are meaningful, educational, and available to the public.

The Museum was chartered under the laws of the state of Texas on June 2, 1967 and granted its tax exemption certificate in August of that year. On October 7, 1968, the Junior League Museum Board entered into a leaning agreement with the City of McAllen for a 5,000 square foot building. Shortly after, a Board of Trustees was appointed and by-laws were adopted. The initial funding came from donations by local business firms, civic organizations, and individuals. An Executive Director was employed in June 1969, and building renovations were completed. The Museum was dedicated and formally opened to the public on October 26, 1969. On July 4, 1976, a new building was constructed and completed as a Bicentennial Project, and the Museum moved to 1900 Nolana, where it currently resides.

A new building expansion, partially funded by the New Millennium Capital Campaign, was constructed and completed in 2001, which added an additional 17,259 square feet to accommodate 3 classrooms, an artist studio, cafe, gift shop, theater, and a hands-on exhibition space called the Children’s Discovery Pavilion. In the same year, the Museum completed its “Community Big Build” project and unveiled “RioScape: A Children’s Discovery Park”, incorporating play in an outdoor learning environment that reflects scientific and environmental concepts specific to the Rio Grande River. The Museum currently has over 50,000 square feet of exhibit space and public access areas.

Events 

 Collage (Gala)
 Brew-seum

 Member Juried Art Show

External links
Official Site
image on Wikimapia

Museums in Hidalgo County, Texas
Art museums and galleries in Texas
Science museums in Texas